Quhajin (also romanized as Qūhajīn; also known as Ghoohchin, Kūhak, Kuhnak, Kukhnak, Qowheyjīn, koyenik, and '''koyenik’’') is a village in Darsajin Rural District, in the Central District of Abhar County, Zanjan Province, Iran. At the 2006 census, its population was 184, in 59 families.

References 

Populated places in Abhar County